Prasanna Acharya (born 8 August 1949) is a politician from Odisha, India who sits in the Rajya Sabha, the upper house of the Indian parliament. He is a member of the Biju Janata Dal (BJD) political party.

Career 
Acharya was a member of the national parliament, the 13th and the 14th Lok Sabha  of India. He represented the Sambalpur constituency of Odisha.

In May 2009 Prasanna Acharya stood for election to the Odisha Assembly rather than for the national parliament. He was elected to represent the regional constituency of Redhakhol by a majority of around 10,000 votes. In the 2014 Odisha Assembly election, Prasanna Acharya lost to Subal Sahu of Indian National Congress by a margin of 458 votes from Bijepur Assembly. In 2019 Prasanna Acharya lost to Suresh Pujari of BJP Party in Loksabha election.

Acharya also held the post of the Minister of Finance in Odisha.

References

External links
 Parliament of India

People from Bargarh
Odisha politicians
Biju Janata Dal politicians
India MPs 1998–1999
India MPs 1999–2004
India MPs 2004–2009
1949 births
Living people
State cabinet ministers of Odisha
Rajya Sabha members from Odisha
Janata Dal politicians